Kharian Tehsil (Punjabi and ) is a tehsil located in Gujrat District, Punjab, Pakistan. The land lies between the rivers of Chenab and Jhelum and in the North the foothills of the mountains of Pir Panjal.

Village and towns of Tehsil Kharian
The tehsil, which is headquartered at the city of Kharian, is administratively subdivided into 43 Union councils.
Complete list Below Here,

References

Gujrat District
Tehsils of Punjab, Pakistan

Village . Chack lashkari near kharian cantt